HLA-A*02 (A*02) is a human leukocyte antigen serotype within the HLA-A serotype group. The serotype is determined by the antibody recognition of the α2 domain of the HLA-A α-chain. For A*02, the α chain is encoded by the HLA-A*02 gene and the β chain is encoded by the B2M locus. In 2010 the World Health Organization Naming Committee for Factors of the HLA System revised the nomenclature for HLAs. Before this revision, HLA-A*02 was also referred to as HLA-A2, HLA-A02, and HLA-A*2.

HLA-A*02 is one particular class I major histocompatibility complex (MHC) allele group at the HLA-A locus. The A*02 allele group can code for many proteins; as of December 2013 there are 456 different HLA-A*02 proteins. Serotyping can identify as far as HLA-A*02, which is typically enough to prevent transplant rejection (the original motivation for HLA identification). Genes can further be separated by genetic sequencing and analysis. HLAs can be identified with as many as nine numbers and a letter (ex. HLA-A*02:101:01:02N). HLA-A*02 is globally common, but particular variants of the allele can be separated by geographic prominence.

Serotype

The serotyping for the most abundant A*02 alleles is good. For A*02:03, A*02:06, A*02:07 serotyping is borderline useful. There is a separate serotyping for A203 and A210. As of December 2013, there are 456 alleles identified (mostly by sequence homology) as being A2, of those 27 are nulls, and a large majority have unknown serotypes, although it is highly probable that they will all return A2 serotypes.

Disease associations

HLAs serve as the primary link between the immune system and interior of cells. Thus any alteration to the HLA that induces decreased binding to a certain peptide or increased binding to a certain peptide, is expressed as, respectively, increased susceptibility to disease or decreased susceptibility to disease. In other words, certain HLAs may be incapable of binding any of the short peptides produced by proteolysis of pathogenic proteins. If HLAs bind none of the peptides produced by a pathogen, then there is no way for the immune system to tell that a cell is infected. Thus the infection can proliferate largely unchecked. It works the other way too. Some HLAs bind pathogenic peptide fragments with very high affinity. This in essence "supercharges" their immune system in regards to that particular pathogen, allowing them to easily control an infection that might otherwise be devastating.

Spontaneous abortion

The HLA-A*02 antigen has been associated with spontaneous abortion in infertile couples. In essence, there are indicators, albeit from a small study comparing HLA expression in fertile and infertile couples, that HLA-A*02 may induce increased maternal immune response to the fetus. This immune response could be compared to an allergic reaction, and, if severe enough, induces abortion of the fetus. Although this is a very interesting correlation, the study which first uncovered this link was quite small and more work needs to be done to verify this hypothesis.

Human immunodeficiency virus

HLA-A*02 appears to stimulate peripheral blood mononuclear cells in a manner that inhibits HIV replication. This could be the reason for a documented 9-fold reduced risk of HIV transmission to infants during childbirth. HIV has evolved mechanisms to combat immune recognition. HIV produces a protein called Nef that binds to the cytoplasmic tail of HLA-A and B and diverts it to the lysosomes for destruction. This prevents the HLAs from being expressed on the cell surface and then functioning properly. In addition, there are several HLA-A*02 haplotypes that appear to contribute heavily to higher or lower viral loads in HIV patients. HLA-A*02-C*16 and HLA-A*02-B*45 have been shown to contribute to significantly increased viral loads (greater than 100,000 copies per milliliter). In summation, HLA-A*02 appears to be somewhat less effective than other HLA-As at protecting against HIV infections.

Hodgkin lymphoma

HLA-A*02 has been linked with decreased risk of developing Epstein-Barr virus (EBV)-positive Hodgkin lymphoma(HL). Among patients with EBV+ HL, only 35.5% of people expressed HLA-A*02 compared to 50.9% in the EBV-HL group and 53% in the control group. This is a significant decrease and is almost certainly a result of the abnormally efficient binding of HLA-A*02 to peptides originating from EBV. This high affinity increases the probability of CD8+ t-cell recognition of EBV peptides held by HLA-A*02 complexes. This, in turn, enhances the immune system's ability to control and clear the EBV, which decreases the change of developing Hodgkin Lymphoma as a result of the infection.

By haplotype
A*02:Cw*16 is associated with increased higher viral load in HIV

Alleles

A2-B haplotypes
A2-B7  (Node in Netherlands)
A2-B5
A2-B51
A2-B52
A2-B8
A2-B13
A2-B14
A2-B64
A2-B65
A2-B15
A2-B62
A2-B63
A2-B70,71,75,76
A2-B46 (Node in Southern China, may be most abundant haplotype)
A2-B16
A2-B44
A2-B45
A2-B18
A2-B27
A2-B35
A2-B37
A2-B39 (Node in North American Amerinds)
A2-B40
A2-B60
A2-B61
A2-B46

A2-Cw5-B44

A2-Cw5-B44 is the multi-serotype designation for the haplotype HLA-A*02:01~C*05:01~B*4402, the class I portion, of an ancestral haplotype (A2~B44~DR4~DQ8). The full haplotype is (for relative distances) see Human leukocyte antigens:

A ~ C ~ B ~ DRB1 ~ DQA1 ~ DQB1

Another haplotype that is more common in Central Europe is the (A2-B44-DR7-DQ2)

A ~ C ~ B ~ DRB1 ~ DQA1 ~ DQB1

Over northwestern Europe A2-B44 shows a single common ancestor which contributed
the Cw5 allele to the haplotype. The haplotype appears to have been introduced early in European prehistoric period, frequencies of the haplotype generally correlate with A1-Cw7-B8 and A2-B7. The haplotype is considerably more equilibrated relative to A1-B8 and a possible reason is gene flow from iberia or the east with related haplotypes after initial migrations.

References 

2